Union territory is a kind of administrative division in India. It may also refer to:

 Naypyidaw Union Territory, a division of Burma
 Union-controlled territory in the American Civil War
 Specifically, Union areas designated as "territories" rather than states during the American Civil War

See also

Federal territory
Union State, post-Soviet association
Territory (disambiguation)
Union (disambiguation)